Nancy Faye Martin (born February 17, 1973 in Rosetown, Saskatchewan) is a Canadian curler from Saskatoon, Saskatchewan.

Career
Martin has been playing on the World Curling Tour since the 2004-05 season. In the 2014-15 season, she joined the Jill Shumay rink at third. She has been skipping a rink since the 2015-16 season.

Martin played in the 2018 Canadian Mixed Doubles Curling Olympic Trials with partner Catlin Schneider. They finished 5-3 and lost in a tiebreaker. She also competed in the 2019 Canadian Mixed Doubles Curling Championship with Tyrel Griffith, losing to Jocelyn Peterman and Brett Gallant in the final.

Martin joined the Sherry Anderson rink for the 2018–19 season. At the 2019 Saskatchewan Scotties Tournament of Hearts, Team Anderson made it all the way to the final where they lost to Robyn Silvernagle 6–5, after giving up a steal in the tenth end. The next season, The team had three semifinal finishes and two quarterfinal finishes on the World Curling Tour. At the 2020 Saskatchewan Scotties Tournament of Hearts, they once again lost in the final to the Robyn Silvernagle rink, this time 8–5. Due to the COVID-19 pandemic in Saskatchewan, the 2021 Saskatchewan Scotties Tournament of Hearts was cancelled. Since the reigning champions, Team Silvernagle, did not retain three out of four team members still playing together, Team Anderson was invited to represent Saskatchewan at the 2021 Scotties Tournament of Hearts, as they had the most points from the 2019–20 and 2020–21 seasons combined, which they accepted. At the Hearts, they finished with a 6–6 sixth place finish.

Personal life
Martin is employed as a civil servant. She is married and has three children.

References

External links

Living people
1973 births
Canadian women curlers
People from Rosetown
Curlers from Saskatoon
20th-century Canadian women
21st-century Canadian women